Richard Gnodde (born March 1960) is a South African investment banker. He is the vice chairman of Goldman Sachs and the chief executive officer of Goldman Sachs International.

Early life
Richard Gnodde graduated from the University of Cape Town, where he earned a Bachelor of Commerce degree, and the University of Cambridge, where he earned a master's degree in law.

Career
Gnodde began his career at Goldman Sachs in London in 1987. Over the course of his career, he worked in Japan, Singapore and Hong Kong. He became a managing director in 1996 and partner in 1998. In 2006, he became the co-chief executive officer of Goldman Sachs International alongside Michael Sherwood.

Since Sherwood's retirement in 2016, Gnodde has been the CEO of Goldman Sachs International as well as vice chairman of Goldman Sachs. According to the Financial Times, he is "in sole charge of the Emea area." In March 2017, Gnodde said Goldman Sachs would move jobs to the continent because of Brexit.

Gnodde attended the 2019 Bilderberg meeting in Montreax, Switzerland between 30 May - 20 June 2019

In the summer of 2019, Gnodde had charges levied against him by the Malaysian government in connection with the 1MDB scandal. The charges were later dropped.

Personal life
Gnodde serves on the board of trust of his alma mater, the University of Cape Town. He is also on the corporate advisory group of Tate. In 2009, he attended a fundraising dinner for the Conservative Party.

Gnodde is one of the highest paid investment bankers in the UK. In 2016, he was the tenth best-paid employee at Goldman Sachs's London office. He is worth an estimated £130 million according to Sunday Times Rich List 2017.

Gnodde has a wife, Kara.

References

Living people
1960s births
Bankers from London
University of Cape Town alumni
Alumni of the University of Cambridge
South African investment bankers
Goldman Sachs people